Haplogroup Q-M25, also known as Q1a1b is a subclade or branch of human Y-DNA haplogroup Q-F1096 (Q1a1), which is, in turn, a subclade of Q-MEH2 (Q1a). In human genetics, each Y-DNA haplogroup constitutes a biological paternal lineages back to a shared common male ancestor.

Distribution 
Q-M25 has descendants in modern populations across all of Eurasia. Only one detailed study on the Y-DNA on Turkmens from Turkmenistan has taken place. Haplogroup Q is found in minority Turkmen tribes living in Afghanistan at percentages of about 32%, and another study found that 42.6% of Iranian Turkmens have haplogroup Q-M25 (also known as Q1a1b).

The Americas
Q-M25 has not been detected in pre-Columbian populations in the Americas.

Asia
Q-M25 has been detected in the Northeast of East Asia, in South Asia, and across Central Asia. Though present at low frequencies, it may be one of the more widely distributed branches of Q-M242 in Asia.

West Asia
The frequency of Q-M25 varies greatly across West Asia. An extreme peak is seen in the Turkmen of Golestan. Across the whole of Iran it varies from over 9 percent of the population in the north to only 2 to 3 percent of the population in the south.  The frequency of Q-M25 drops to only about 1 percent of the population of Lebanon's Muslims, and it is absent from the non-Muslim population there. However, its presence in the Marsh Arabs(related to Sumer) of Iraq hints that Q-M25's West Asian history extends beyond a single localized recent founder.

Europe
Q-M25 is present across modern Turkey and in Eastern Europe.

Associated SNP's 
Haplogroup Q-M25 is defined by the presence of the M25 Single Nucleotide Polymorphism (SNP) as well as the M143, L714, and L716 SNPs.

Phylogenetic Tree 
This is Thomas Krahn at the Genomic Research Center's Draft tree Proposed Tree for haplogroup Q-M25.

 Q-M25 M25, M143, L714, L716
 Q-L712 L712
 Q-L713 L697.2, L713, L715, M365.3

See also
Human Y-chromosome DNA haplogroup

Y-DNA Q-M242 Subclades

Y-DNA Backbone Tree

References

External links 
The Y-DNA Haplogroup Q Project

Q-M25